Luke Garrett (born 11 January 1995) is a Welsh rugby union player who plays as a prop forward having previously played for Cross Keys RFC. He made his debut for the Dragons on 25 April 2015 versus the Scarlets, who he later joined on loan for the first half of the 2016-17 season after Rob Evans was ruled out with an injury. He was released by the Dragons at the end of the 2017-18 season.

International
Garrett was a Wales under-20 international.

References

External links 
Dragons profile

Rugby union players from Abergavenny
Welsh rugby union players
Dragons RFC players
Cross Keys RFC players
Living people
1995 births
Rugby union props